The first season of Star Trek: Enterprise (then titled simply Enterprise), an American television series, began airing on September 26, 2001, on UPN. The season concluded after 26 episodes on May 22, 2002. The series was developed by Rick Berman and Brannon Braga, who also served as executive producers. Season one regular cast members include Scott Bakula, Jolene Blalock, Connor Trinneer, Dominic Keating, Linda Park, Anthony Montgomery and John Billingsley.

Plot overview
The first two seasons of Star Trek: Enterprise depict the human exploration of interstellar space by the crew of an Earth ship able to go farther and faster than any humans had previously gone, due to the breaking of the warp barrier, analogous to the Bell X-1 breaking the sound barrier. In the ninety years since Star Trek: First Contact, the Vulcans have been mentoring and guiding humans, routinely holding back scientific knowledge in an effort to keep them contained close to home, believing them to be too impulsive and emotionally dominated to function properly in an interstellar community. When Enterprise finally sets out, the Vulcans, often represented by T'Pol, are conspicuously close by. This generates some conflict as, in several early episodes, Archer and others often complain of the Vulcans' unsubtle methods of keeping an eye on them.

The early encounters and historic culture of familiar Star Trek franchise races, such as the Vulcans, Klingons, Andorians,  Ferengi, Nausicaans, and Risans are also explored further. The crew faces situations that are familiar to Star Trek fans, but are unencumbered and unjaded by the experience and rules which have built up over hundreds of years of Trek lore and canon established in previous Star Trek series. Star Trek: Enterprise takes pains to show the origins of some concepts which have become taken for granted in Star Trek canon, such as Lieutenant Reed's development of force fields and red alerts, and Captain Archer's and Sub-Commander T'Pol's questions about cultural interference eventually being resolved by later series' Prime Directive.

A recurring plot device is the Temporal Cold War, in which a mysterious entity from the 27th century uses the Cabal, a group of genetically upgraded aliens of the Suliban species, to manipulate the timeline and change past events. Sometimes sabotaging Enterprise's mission and sometimes saving the ship from destruction, the entity's motives are unknown. Agent Daniels, a Temporal Agent from the 31st century responsible for policing the timeline, occasionally visits Archer to assist him in fighting the Suliban and undoing damage caused by the Temporal Cold War.

Cast

Main cast

Recurring cast

Episodes 

In the following table, episodes are listed by the order in which they aired.

Broadcast

Reception 
In reviewing the first season, DVDVerdict.com described the show as "seriously flawed" and noted "weak story telling". IGN awarded the first season of the series a score of 6 out of 10, stating that "for every solid episode like Dear Doctor ... there's a dreadful misfire like Silent Enemy" and attributed the show's declining audience figures to the "early rocky-going". AJ Carson of tvdvdreviewswas more positive, describing the first season as "flawed, but it is still among TV's best sci-fi series". While Carson noted problems such as "one dimensional" secondary characters and a visual aesthetic that was at odds with the series' place in the chronology of the franchise, it was also noted that the "series looks terrific, its cast is immensely likeable, and its scripts are intelligent". In his 2022 rewatch, Keith DeCandido of Tor.com gave the season 1 a rating of 4 out of 10. He says the premise is good in theory but in practice the most interesting thing they do with it is to put humanity into the middle of the Vulcan-Andorian conflict, and describes much of the season as "uninteresting and unexciting and mundane". DeCandido is critical of "Trek's Worst Opening Credits Theme Music" juxtaposed with "Trek's Most Visually Exciting Opening Credits".

In 2019, CBR rated Season 1 of Enterprise as the 27th best season of all Star Trek seasons up to that time, ranking it lower than any of the other three seasons.

Awards
Two episodes of the first season of Enterprise won and were nominated for various Emmy Awards. The series premiere "Broken Bow" was awarded an Emmy for "Outstanding Special Visual Effects for a Series" and was nominated for two other categories, "Outstanding Sound Editing for a Series" and "Outstanding Makeup for a Series (Prosthetic)". A later episode, "Two Days and Two Nights", won in the category "Outstanding Hairstyling for a Series".

Media information
The first season DVD was released on May 3, 2005, ten days before the broadcast of the final episode of the series. This release marked a couple of firsts for Star Trek TV series DVD releases. It was the first to include extensive deleted scenes (although footage cut from the premiere of Voyager had been included in a featurette previously), and it was the first to include an outtakes or blooper reel.

References

External links

 Season 1 on Memory Alpha
 Season guide on IMDb

Star Trek: Enterprise
2001 American television seasons
2002 American television seasons
Enterprise